Andrew O. Brenner (born January 14, 1971) is a U.S. Republican party politician and member of the Ohio Senate, currently serving his first term for the 19th Senate District.

Biography
In 2010, former Representative Kris Jordan moved to the Ohio Senate, and Brenner ran for his open seat. In the Republican Primary, Brenner faced five opponents collecting 24.4% of the vote.  In the general election, facing Richard Bird, he won by 26,000 votes. Representative Brenner served as Delaware County Recorder from 2005 until 2010 before his election to the Ohio House. Prior to his election as Recorder, he served on the Kingston Township zoning board and as a representative to the Delaware County Regional Planning Commission for Kingston Township. He earned his Bachelor of Science in Business Administration from The Ohio State University in 1993, majoring in marketing and economics. Upon graduation from college he spent 11 years as an entrepreneur in the real estate and mortgage fields.

Over his four terms in the Ohio senate, Brenner sponsored multiple pieces of legislation. House Bills 58, 102, 124, and 217 of the 132nd General Assembly reflected his interest in education. Additionally, Brenner was also appointed as chairman of the Ohio House Education and Career Readiness Committee that hears policy regarding matters of education in grades kindergarten through 12th grade in the state of Ohio.

In November 2018, Brenner was elected to Ohio's 19th senatorial district, representing Delaware, Knox and parts of Franklin counties.

Ohio SB 23, aka Heartbeat Bill
With Kristina Roegner, Brenner was a co-sponsor of SB 23, also known as the "Heartbeat Bill", subsequently signed into law by Governor Mike DeWine, which significantly expanded the circumstances under which abortion would be treated as a felony.

Personal life
Brenner was born in Columbus, Ohio and graduated from Ohio State University in 1993 with a Bachelor of Science in Business Administration. He is married to Sara Marie Brenner, and lives in Delaware.

Controversies
Brenner has been the subject of controversy multiple times throughout his legislative career for comparing functions of the state government to those of Nazi Germany. On April 22, 2020, immediately following Holocaust Remembrance Day, Brenner and his wife made public posts on Facebook comparing Ohio Department of Health policy concerning the COVID-19 pandemic of then-director Amy Acton, who is Jewish, to Nazi Germany. Ohio Governor and fellow Republican Mike DeWine condemned Brenner's comments.

In another controversy, on May 3, 2021, Brenner participated in a public legislative Zoom meeting while driving. He used the background feature in an apparent attempt to conceal this fact and make it appear as if he were in an office, however his seatbelt was still visible. Brenner claims that he was not distracted.

References

External links
Andrew Brenner (campaign site)

Living people
1971 births
Republican Party members of the Ohio House of Representatives
Ohio State University Fisher College of Business alumni
21st-century American politicians
Politicians from Columbus, Ohio
People from Powell, Ohio
Republican Party Ohio state senators